International Immunology is a peer-reviewed medical journal published by Oxford University Press on behalf of the Japanese Society for Immunology, addressing studies in allergology and immunology.

Abstracting and indexing 
International Immunology is abstracted and indexed in Science Citation Index, Current Contents/Life Sciences, MEDLINE/Index Medicus, EMBASE, and BIOSIS Previews. According to the Journal Citation Reports, its 2009 impact factor is 3.403, ranking it 41 out of 128 journals in the category "Immunology".

External links 
 
 Japanese Society for Immunology

English-language journals
Publications established in 1989
Immunology journals
Monthly journals
Oxford University Press academic journals